Prior to the year 1875, the tical was the currency of Cambodia as well as Siam and Laos. However, as a result of French intervention in the region, the tical in Cambodia was replaced in 1875 by the Cambodian franc. The term tical was the name which foreigners used for the local word baht (which gave rise to the modern Thai baht). The word baht actually referred to a weight in relation to a weight of silver, since the monetary system was based on the weight of silver coins. The tical (or baht) was a silver coin weighing 15 grams, hence giving it a rough similarity in value to the Indian rupee. The tical was subdivided into 64 att, 32 pe, 8 fuang or 4 salong.

Coins
In 1847 and 1848, coins were issued in denominations of 1 att, 1 and 2 pe, 1 fuang, 1 and 4 tical. Many of the smaller coins were uniface.

References

External links

Cambodian Currency Collection - Depicts every banknote issued by National Bank of Cambodia

Currencies of Cambodia
Modern obsolete currencies
Economic history of Cambodia
1875 disestablishments